Richard Dahl (also known as Rickard Dahl; 5 August 1933 – 8 August 2007) was a Swedish track and field athlete who competed in the high jump.

Career
In 1957 Dahl won his first significant medal, a silver at the national championships behind Stig Pettersson, the leading Swedish jumper of the era. Both repeated that placing the following year.

He became the fourth, and thus the latest male Swede to win the title, following Kurt Lundqvist, Anton Bolinder and Bengt Nilsson. For this performance he was awarded the Svenska Dagbladet Gold Medal and designated the Stora grabbars märke number 200 in athletics.

Dahl won two more international medals – a bronze at the 1959 International University Games (clearing two metres) and a silver at the inaugural Nordic Athletics Championships (where he lost to Petterssen by ten centimetres). His final achievement of note was a third place at the Swedish Championships in 1960. After retiring from competition, he became a sports journalist for the local paper Länstidningen Södertälje, and later for the regional Nordvästra Skånes Tidningar.

References

1933 births
2007 deaths
Swedish male high jumpers
European Athletics Championships medalists
People from Landskrona Municipality
Sportspeople from Skåne County